Kevin T. Van Tassell (born March 3, 1952) is an American politician and former manager of Zion's Bank in Vernal, Utah. A Republican, he is a member of the Utah State Senate, representing the state's 26th senate district in Daggett, Duchesne, Summit, Uintah and Wasatch Counties.

Early life, education, and career

Van Tassell attended Brigham Young University and graduated from American Banker's Commercial Lending School. He is a banker by profession. Van Tassell is the past president of the Duchesne County Hospital Board and has been a member of the Intermountain Farmer Board of Directors, Vernal Chamber of Commerce Dinamites, and Vernal Rotary Club.

Van Tassell is married to his wife, Janice, who helps out in the Senate every year.
His daughter, Nicole, joined a Mormon polygamist group.  Van Tassell sponsored a bill to increase the severity of Utah's polygamy penalties when she chose to leave polygamy.

Political career
Van Tassell was elected to the Senate in 2005 and began his service in 2006. During his legislative service, Van Tassell was the recipient of the Utah Adult Protective Services Outstanding Achievement Award and the "It begins with Me Award" from Zion's Bank. Senator Van Tassell is the Chair for the Senate Rules Committee.

In 2016, Van Tassell served on the following committees: 
Infrastructure and General Government Appropriations Subcommittee
Natural Resources, Agriculture, and Environmental Quality Appropriations Subcommittee
Senate Rules Committee (Chair)
Senate Transportation and Public Utilities and Technology Committee 
Senate Health and Human Services Committee

Election

2014

Legislation

2016 sponsored bills

References 

Living people
American Latter Day Saints
Brigham Young University alumni
Republican Party Utah state senators
1952 births
21st-century American politicians
People from Vernal, Utah